South Elkins is a neighborhood in the city of Elkins, West Virginia, located across the Tygart Valley River from downtown. The town of South Elkins was incorporated in 1899 and consolidated with the city of Elkins in 1901.

References
NRHP registration form: First Ward School
David Armstrong, South Elkins Was Its Own Town At Turn of Century

Neighborhoods in West Virginia
Former municipalities in West Virginia
Elkins, West Virginia